This is a list of electoral constituencies returning Members of Parliament to the Parliament of Greece. The list reflects the changes which were made to Athens B and Attica in December 2018. Electoral constituencies account for 288 of the 300 parliamentary seats, while the other 12 are elected on a national level through party-list proportional representation. Each constituency, with the exception of those in Attica and Thessaloniki, corresponds to a single prefecture of Greece, even though these were abolished in 2010.

The number of seats in each constituency is calculated by first finding the national quota. This is done by dividing the total number of legal residents in the country, as counted at the latest census, by 288  the number of seats in the Parliament elected in constituencies; using the 2011 census, the current quota is 34,385 residents per seat. The actual number of seats per constituency is then calculated in two steps. First by dividing the legal resident population of each constituency with the national quota and rounding down, so that Athens A for example gets 13 seats with a sum of 13.59 while Evrytania gets 0 with a sum of 0.90. Because the sums are rounded down, there are always leftover seats which are then allocated in the second step, by awarding one additional seat to each constituency, in descending order of leftover sums, until all 288 constituency seats have been allocated. In the 2018 apportionment of seats, 263 seats were allocated in the first step and 25 in the second.

In addition, Greece is a single 21-seat constituency of the European Parliament.

See also
Apportionment in the Hellenic Parliament

Notes
A further 12 seats are elected at a national level through party-list proportional representation, bringing the total number of seats to 300.

References

 
Greece
Constituencies